Calosoma leleuporum is a species of ground beetle in the subfamily of Carabinae. It was described by Basilewsky in 1968.

References

leleuporum
Beetles described in 1968